This is a list of the main career statistics of professional German tennis player, Andrea Petkovic. To date, Petkovic has won seven WTA singles titles including one year-ending championship at the 2014 Tournament of Champions. Other highlights of Petkovic's career include a runner-up finish at the 2011 China Open, a semifinal appearance at the 2014 French Open and quarterfinal appearances at the 2011 Australian Open and 2011 US Open. Petkovic achieved a career-high singles ranking of world No. 9 on October 10, 2011.

Career achievements

In July 2009, Petkovic won the first WTA Tour singles title of her career at the International event in Bad Gastein, Austria after a straight sets win over Ioana Raluca Olaru in the final. At the 2011 Australian Open, she defeated the 2008 champion and former world No. 1, Maria Sharapova in the fourth round to reach her first Grand Slam quarterfinal where she lost in straight sets to the ninth seed and eventual runner-up, Li Na. In March 2011, she reached her first Premier Mandatory semifinal at the Sony Ericsson Open, upsetting world No. 1, Caroline Wozniacki, and sixth seed Jelena Janković en route before falling to Sharapova in three sets. Two months later, she won her second career singles title at the Internationaux de Strasbourg before reaching her second consecutive Grand Slam quarterfinal at the French Open where she lost to Sharapova in straight sets, winning just three games. After quarterfinal and semifinal appearances at the Rogers Cup and Western & Southern Open respectively, Petkovic reached her third Grand Slam quarterfinal of the year at the US Open, where she lost in straight sets to the top-seeded Wozniacki. In October, she reached the biggest final of her career to date at the China Open where she lost to the 11th seed Agnieszka Radwańska in three sets. Petkovic rose to a career high of World No. 9 as a result of this performance and eventually finished the year ranked World No. 10, marking her first finish in the year-end top ten.

In April 2014, Petkovic won her first WTA Premier singles title and first career title on green clay at the Family Circle Cup, defeating Jana Čepelová (who had upset world No. 1 and two-time defending champion, Serena Williams earlier in the tournament) in the final. It was Petkovic's first tour level singles title in three years and remains the biggest title of her career thus far. In June, Petkovic advanced to her first Grand Slam semifinal at the French Open, defeating tenth seed and 2012 finalist Sara Errani en route before losing to the eventual runner-up, Simona Halep, in straight sets. The following month, she won her second title in Bad Gastein, defeating first time finalist Shelby Rogers, in straight sets.

Performance timelines

Only main-draw results in WTA Tour, Grand Slam tournaments, Fed Cup/Billie Jean King Cup and Olympic Games are included in win–loss records.

Singles

Doubles

Significant finals

WTA Tournament of Champions

Singles: 1 (1 title)

WTA Premier Mandatory & Premier 5 finals

Singles: 1 (1 runner-up)

WTA career finals

Singles: 13 (7 titles, 6 runner-ups)

Doubles: 3 (1 title, 2 runner-ups)

Team competition: 1 (1 runner-up)

ITF career finals

Singles: 13 (9 titles, 4 runner–ups)

Doubles: 5 (3 titles, 2 runner–ups)

Head-to-head records

Record against top-10 players

Petkovic's record against players who have been ranked in the top 10, with those who are active in boldface.

Record against No. 11–20 players 
Petkovic's record against players who have been ranked world No. 11–20.

 Kirsten Flipkens 4–2
 Anna-Lena Grönefeld 3–0
 Barbora Strýcová 3–3
 Elena Vesnina 3–3
 Alizé Cornet 3–5
 Mihaela Buzărnescu 2–0
 Sabine Lisicki 2–0
 Anastasia Pavlyuchenkova 2–1
 Aravane Rezaï 2–1
 Alona Bondarenko 1–0
 Eleni Daniilidou 1–0
 Nathalie Dechy 1–0
 Beatriz Haddad Maia 1–0
 Magda Linette 1–0
 Shahar Pe'er 1–0
 Virginie Razzano 1–0
 Liudmila Samsonova 1–0
 Katarina Srebotnik 1–0
 Zheng Jie 1–0
 Sybille Bammer 1–1
 Anabel Medina Garrigues 1–1
 Alison Riske-Amritraj 1–1
 Donna Vekić 1–1
 Varvara Lepchenko 1–2
 Yanina Wickmayer 1–2
 Petra Martić 1–3
 Ekaterina Alexandrova 0–1
 Jennifer Brady 0–1
 Leylah Fernandez 0–1
 Alisa Kleybanova 0–1
 María José Martínez Sánchez 0–1
 Daria Saville 0–1
 Karolína Muchová 0–1
 Peng Shuai 0–1
 Anastasija Sevastova 0–1
 Karolina Šprem 0–1
 Markéta Vondroušová 0–1
 Wang Qiang 0–1
 Elise Mertens 0–2
 Kaia Kanepi 0–3
 Ágnes Szávay 0–3
 Magdaléna Rybáriková 0–5

* Statistics correct .

Top 10 wins
Petkovic has a  record against players who were, at the time the match was played, ranked in the top 10.

Billie Jean King Cup / Fed Cup performance 

Note: Levels of Fed Cup in which Germany did not compete in a particular year are marked "not participating" or "NP".

Notes

References

External links
 WTA profile
 ITF profile
 
 

Petkovic, Andrea